Raymond K. Johnson (1901–1999) was an American cinematographer and film director. He directed more than twenty films, mainly low budget westerns, for Poverty Row studios such as Monogram Pictures.

After service in World War II Johnson joined camera unit at MGM's Hollywood studio, which he eventually came to head the department.

Filmography
 North of Nome (1925)
 All Faces West (1929)
 Kentucky Blue Streak (1935)
 Skybound (1935)
 Suicide Squad (1935)
 The Reckless Way (1936)
 I'll Name the Murderer (1936)
 Special Agent K-7 (1937)
 Daughter of the Tong (1939)
 Code of the Fearless (1939)
 Fangs of the Wild (1939)
 Two Gun Troubador (1939)
 In Old Montana (1939)
 Law of the Wolf (1939)
 Ridin' the Trail (1940)
 Covered Wagon Trails (1940)
 Pinto Canyon (1940)
 Land of the Six Guns (1940)
 The Kid from Santa Fe (1940)
 Riders from Nowhere (1940)
 Wild Horse Range (1940)
 The Cheyenne Kid (1940)

References

Bibliography
 Pitts, Michael R. Poverty Row Studios, 1929-1940. McFarland & Company, 2005.

External links

1901 births
1999 deaths
American film directors
People from North Dakota
American cinematographers